Schöner fremder Mann is the fourth German single recorded by U. S. entertainer Connie Francis.

The song is the German cover version of Francis' U. S. recording Someone Else's Boy. Although the original version didn't chart, it became one of Francis' biggest international successes, and it is the only song in her repertoire she recorded in eight languages:

English
German 
French (as Celui que je veux)
Italian (as Ti conquisterò)
Spanish (as El novio de otra, a. k. a. Mi tonto amor)
Portuguese (as Um amor so meu)
Dutch (as Jij bent niet van mij)
Japanese (as 夢のデイト - Yume no Deito).

Schöner fremder Mann became Francis' biggest hit to date in West Germany, peaking at # 1.

The B-side of the single was Funiculì, Funiculà, an Italian recording from her U. S. album More Italian Favorites.

Schöner fremder Mann was Francis' last single in West Germany to feature a foreign language song on the B-side. All subsequent singles would feature German-language recordings on both sides.

The song is featured at the end of West German director Rainer Werner Fassbinder's 1978 film In a Year of 13 Moons.

References

1961 singles
Connie Francis songs
Number-one singles in Germany
1961 songs
MGM Records singles